A capsule review or mini review is a form of appraisal, usually associated with journalism, that offers a relatively short critique of a specified creative work (movie, music album, restaurant, painting, etc.).  Capsule reviews generally appear in publications like newspapers and magazines, and may be placed within the context of a cultural digest section of a publication. 

Leonard Maltin's Movie Guide is a well known publication that includes thousands of capsule movie reviews by prolific film writer Leonard Maltin, including the world's shortest capsule review according to the Guinness Book of World Records, a 2 out of 4 star review of the 1948 musical Isn't It Romantic? that consisted of only the word "no".

See also 
 Christgau's Record Guide

References
Martin Stevens and Jeffery Kluewer. "The Short Summary and Capsule Review". Critical Reading and Writing. Longman. 1983. Page 375 et seq. Google Books

Newswriting
Art criticism
Opinion journalism